The Moondog Coronation Ball was a concert held at the Cleveland Arena in Cleveland, Ohio, on March 21, 1952. It is generally accepted as the first major rock and roll concert.

Background

Alan Freed "had joined WJW [-Radio] in 1951 as the host of a classical-music program, but he took up a different kind of music at the suggestion of Cleveland record-store owner Leo Mintz, who had noted with great interest the growing popularity, among young customers of all races, of rhythm-and-blues records by black musicians", according to the "History" website. Mintz decided to sponsor Freed's three hours of late-night programming. Once they saw the popularity of the program increase, they decided on holding a live dance event featuring some of the artists whose records were appearing on Freed's show.

Concert
The concert was organized by Freed (a disc jockey and considered to have popularized the term "Rock and Roll" at WJW-Radio), along with Lew Platt, a local concert promoter, and Freed's sponsors, including Mintz, owner of the Record Rendezvous store.  The concert featured Paul Williams and the Hucklebuckers, and Tiny Grimes and the Rocking Highlanders (an African American instrumental group that appeared in kilts). Also on the bill were the Dominoes, Varetta Dillard and Danny Cobb.

The concert was  held on March 21, 1952. More tickets were printed than the arena's actual capacity, in part due to counterfeiting and a printing error. With an estimated 20,000 individuals trying to crowd into an arena that held slightly more than half that — and worries that a riot might break out as people tried to crowd in — the fire authorities shut down the concert after the first song by opening act Paul "Hucklebuck" Williams ended. Freed made a public apology on WJW the next day; he referred to the event as the "ball" or "dance," not as a "concert."

Accounts in the contemporary Cleveland newspapers are at odds with lore that circulates today about the event, scheduled to begin at 10 p.m. “The frustrated gathered outside, unable to buy a ticket at $1.75, their number increasing until it amounted to about 6,000” as estimated by Cleveland Police captain William Zimmerman. “About 9:30 they stormed the Arena, knocking down four panel doors, brushing police away and storming inside. Some two hours and 30 policemen later, Captain Zimmerman called it a night…. After ordering the ball ended, Capt. Zimmerman asked the crowd to leave. Police stood by as they slowly and reluctantly filed out.” This indicates that the event was not halted after Paul Williams’ opening song, and that Cleveland's police rather than fire department ended the Ball.

Journalist Valena Williams’ first-person report also confirms that the musical performances lasted for some time: “Paul Williams and his Hucklebuckers left the stage and Tiny Grimes and his Highlanders took over. I thought the acoustics were poor because I couldn’t hear the music. But then I realized that the din was drowning out the orchestra. I looked back at the dance floor and more than three-quarters of it was filled so tightly that you couldn’t see anything of the floor itself.” Williams described sharing her concerns about the boisterous crowd with promoter Lewis Platt, who “laughed”; she noted that “[W]hen the Arena bar was ordered shut down at 10:30 I knew the crowd was disturbing police authority, too.”

The “Coronation Ball” aspect of the event referred to scheduled intermission festivities, as Williams explained: “When I got home I was not surprised to hear the live broadcast from the Arena cut off the air. I learned later the dance had at that time been stopped. The midnight coronation of the two most popular teenagers was never held.”

Williams’ eyewitness writeup includes her colorful descriptions of the youthful crowd, “most of them teensters.” Though Alan Freed is rightfully heralded for bringing black rhythm-and-blues to an integrated audience on Cleveland's airwaves and elsewhere, the crowd at the Moondog Coronation Ball in Cleveland's Arena was notably different. Williams chronicled for posterity the racial makeup of the dance's attendees: “less than one per cent of them were white.”

Contemporary revival
Cleveland rock radio station WMMS (100.7 FM) attempted to stage a revival of the concert in 1986 under the name "Moondog Coronation Ball II"; then-program director John Gorman had intended for the event to serve as an oldies rock and roll tribute concert – part of the campaign to bring the Rock and Roll Hall of Fame to Cleveland.  For legal reasons, the event never materialized.  A few years later in 1992, Gorman, then at local oldies radio station WMJI (105.7 FM), successfully organized a 40th anniversary concert called "Moondog Coronation Ball '92".  The concert has been held every year since, featuring oldies rock and roll acts, and sponsored by WMJI.  In recent years, the event has been held at Rocket Mortgage FieldHouse.

References

Further reading

External links
 FiftiesWeb.com: Moondog Coronation Ball
 WMJI.com: 2014 Moondog Coronation Ball
 WMJI.com: 2016 Moondog Coronation Ball

History of Cleveland
Concerts in the United States
1952 in American music
1952 in Ohio
Music of Cleveland
March 1952 events in the United States
Rock and roll